Lockyer may refer to:

 Cape Lockyer
 Electoral district of Lockyer, Queensland, Australia
 Lockyer (lunar crater)
 Lockyer (Martian crater)
 Lockyer (surname)
 Lockyer Creek
 Lockyer Hotel
 Lockyer Island
 Lockyer National Park
 Lockyer railway station, closed railway station on the Main Line railway in Queensland, Australia
 Lockyer v. Andrade, 2003 lawsuit
 Lockyer Valley Region
 Lockyer Valley, Queensland
 Lockyer Waters, Queensland
 Lockyer, Queensland
 Lockyer, Western Australia
 Silveira v. Lockyer, 2002 lawsuit

See also
 Locker (disambiguation)